Maria Nilsson (born 7 June 1979) is a Swedish politician from the Liberals. On 13 April 2022, she became party secretary of the Liberals after Juno Blom's resignation.

See also 

 List of members of the Riksdag, 2018–2022

References 

Living people
1979 births
Members of the Riksdag 2018–2022
21st-century Swedish women politicians
21st-century Swedish politicians
Women members of the Riksdag
Members of the Riksdag from the Liberals (Sweden)
Liberals (Sweden) politicians
Leaders of political parties in Sweden